Elsinoe rosarum, Anthracnose, is a fungal plant pathogen. It is a condition found on roses, causing leaves to have irregular dark margins and spots. The disease usually appears during wet weather.

References

External links 
 Brief description of E. rosarum
  Index Fungorum 
  USDA ARS Fungal Database

Fungal plant pathogens and diseases
Rose diseases
Elsinoë
Fungi described in 1881